Aneta Pospíšilová is a Czech football player, who played for Zbrojovka Brno in the Czech First Division.

She is a member of the Czech national team. She made her debut for the national team on 25 October 2009 in a match against Wales.

References

1991 births
Living people
Czech women's footballers
Czech Republic women's international footballers
FC Zbrojovka Brno players
Women's association football forwards